Michael Fietz (born November 13, 1967 in Bochum, West Germany) is a long-distance runner.  In 1997 he won the Frankfurt Marathon. He represented Germany at the 2000 Summer Olympics marathon in Sydney, Australia, finishing in 37th place, with a time of 2:20:09.

Achievements

References
  Profile
https://www.olympic.org/michael-fietz

1967 births
Living people
German male long-distance runners
Athletes (track and field) at the 2000 Summer Olympics
Olympic athletes of Germany
Sportspeople from Bochum
Frankfurt Marathon male winners
German male marathon runners